Rugby Northeast is a college rugby conference operating in Northeastern United States and administered by USA Rugby. As of 2022, the conference is formed by 21 teams.

Members

Men's

Women's

Former

Champions

References

External links
 

College rugby conferences in the United States
College rugby union competitions in the United States
Rugby union governing bodies in the United States
2011 establishments in the United States